Toby Salmon (born 26 March 1993) is a professional rugby union player who plays for RFU Championship side Saracens as a lock forward. He is on loan from Premiership Rugby side Newcastle Falcons.

He was signed in the summer of 2017 from the Rotherham Titans He scored a try on 30 March 2018 as Exeter beat Bath Rugby in the final of the Anglo-Welsh Cup.

On 10 March 2021, it was confirmed that Salmon had joined Saracens on a loan deal for the remainder of the 2020–21 season.

Honours
Anglo-Welsh Cup
Winners 2017–18

References

1993 births
Living people
English rugby union players
Exeter Chiefs players
London Irish players
Newcastle Falcons players
Rotherham Titans players
Rugby union players from Norwich
Saracens F.C. players
Rugby union locks